Grand-Failly is a commune in the Meurthe-et-Moselle department in north-eastern France.

Geography
The river Othain flows northwestward through the south-western part of the commune; the Chiers forms part of its northern border.

See also
Communes of the Meurthe-et-Moselle department

References

Grandfailly